Naypyidaw Council (also spelt Nay Pyi Taw Council) is the executive body under the President of Myanmar that administers Naypyidaw Union Territory.

The Council is formed by the President, who appoints members based on constitutional requirements. The President must nominate both civilian and Armed Services personnel into the Council membership. The Council, which is headed by a Chairperson, reports directly to the President. The Constitution also holds that the Naypyidaw Council shares offices with the Ministry of Home Affairs' General Administration Department (GAD), and that the head of GAD serves as an ex-officio secretary of the Naypyidaw Council.

See also
 Government of Myanmar

References

External links
Official website

Government agencies of Myanmar
Naypyidaw